Dobbs Ferry Union Free School District is a grade K–12 school district based in Dobbs Ferry, New York, in the Hudson Valley, approximately 20 miles north of midtown Manhattan. It is a Union Free School District, which relates to its organizational structure and is unrelated to labor unions (teachers are members of Dobbs Ferry United Teachers ). The district is small as compared to most of the districts in Westchester County, New York, with approximately 112 students per grade in three schools: Springhurst Elementary School; Dobbs Ferry Middle School; and Dobbs Ferry High School.

The governing body of the school district is the elected board of education, which contains seven members, each serving a three-year term. The board members elect a president and vice-president for one-year terms. The board of education hires the superintendent of the school district. The current superintendent is Kenneth Slentz.

Springhurst Elementary School 
Springhurst Elementary School is a small coeducational public elementary school in Dobbs Ferry, New York. Grades range from Kindergarten to fifth grade.

Dobbs Ferry Middle School 

Dobbs Ferry Middle School is a coeducational public middle school. Grades range from sixth to eighth. Dobbs Ferry uses the International Baccalaureate (IB) Middle Years Programme (MYP) throughout its curriculum.

Dobbs Ferry High School
Dobbs Ferry High School is a coeducational public high school and, since 1997, an IB World School.

Athletics 
Dobbs Ferry High School's small size enables a high percentage of students to join varsity and junior varsity teams. These teams compete in many sports, including squash, tennis, ping pong, racquetball, pickle ball and Turkish Oil Wrestling.

Parent and community support of school district 
Parents in the district have founded several associated groups supporting and representing their interests in the district. These include:
 Dobbs Ferry Parent-Teacher-Student Association (PTSA): known elsewhere as the "PTA" but including high school student representatives, the PTSA is the formal body by which parents support the students.
 Dobbs Ferry Schools Foundation: raises funds through an annual gala to supplement school programs and teacher training.
 SPRING Community Partners: ensures that all children in the district have the resources they need to succeed in school and beyond.
 Dobbs Ferry Trailguides: a support and advocacy group for children, founded by parents of children with special needs.

Geographic boundaries 
The Dobbs Ferry school district's boundaries are not identical to those of the Village of Dobbs Ferry. Some residents of the Ardsley Park neighborhood of the village of Irvington fall in the Dobbs Ferry school district. All residents of the Northfield neighborhood of Dobbs Ferry, and some residents of the Knoll and Southfield neighborhoods, fall in the Ardsley school district. Residents in properties straddling borders with neighboring districts get to choose.

History
The first purpose-built school building in the village was on Main Street, built in 1857, roughly opposite the present town hall. That served until 1896, when a new building was completed on Broadway, just south of the present High School, on what had been the Appleton estate. That 1896 building was doubled in size in the early 20th century with an addition on the back. The addition became the high school, and the front part was the elementary school. The building was dedicated Dec 22, 1896, and the ceremony was recounted in the Dec 25, 1896, issue of the Dobbs Ferry Register, on page 1. The present high school was a WPA project, begun in 1934 and completed in 1936. The 1896 building and the 1936 building sat side by side and comprised the entire school system until Springhurst School was building on the former F. Q. Brown estate in the late 1950s. There was a long battle in the village over whether to build Springhurst. Many times, it was put to a vote and defeated, even though the old buildings were overcrowded and students in many grades were on "double session"—meaning some went from very early in the morning until mid-day and others started at mid-day and stayed until late afternoon. After Springhurst was built, the 1896 building became the middle school, housing grades 5 through 8. In the 1960s or early 70s, Springhurst was expanded and the 1896 building, which was becoming structurally unsound, was demolished.
(Additional Source: Personal recollections as a student in the schools (James Luckett) 1955 - 1966.)

References

External links
Dobbs Ferry Union Free School District
High School Principal's Corner
DFHS Facebook Page
DFHS Principal's Blog
The Digital Eagle, the online student newspaper

School districts in Westchester County, New York